Cheria-Bariarpur is an assembly constituency in Begusarai district in the Indian state of Bihar.

Overview
As per Delimitation of Parliamentary and Assembly constituencies Order, 2008, No. 141 Cheria Bariarpur Assembly constituency is composed of the following:  Cheria-Bariarpur, Khodabandpur and Chaurahi community development blocks; Pahsara (West) and Maheshwara gram panchayats of Nawkothi CD Block.

Cheria-Bariarpur Assembly constituency is part of No. 24 Begusarai (Lok Sabha constituency).

Members of Legislative Assembly

Election results

1977-2010
In the 2010 state assembly elections, Manju Verma of JD(U) won the Cheria Bariarpur seat defeating her nearest rival Anil Kumar Chaudhary of LJP. Contests in most years were multi cornered but only winners and runners up are being mentioned. Anil Chaudhary of LJP defeated Kumari Savitri of RJD in October 2005 and Radha Krishna Singh of RJD in February 2005. Ashok Kumar of RJD defeated Anil Chaudhary of JD(U) in 2000. Ram Jeewan Singh of JD defeated Late Sri Sukh Deo Mahato of Congress in 1995 and Late Sri Sukhdeo Mahato, Independent, in 1990. Harihar Mahato of Congress defeated Late Sri Sukhdeo Mahato of CPI in 1985. Late Sri Sukhdeo Mahato of CPI defeated Harihar Mahato of Congress (I) in 1980. Harihar Mahato of Congress defeated Jubair Azam Zaffri of Janata Party.

2020

2015

References

External links
 

Assembly constituencies of Bihar
Politics of Begusarai district